Beatrice Nedberge Llano (born 14 December 1997) is a Norwegian athlete specialising in the hammer throw. She won a gold medal at the 2016 World U20 Championships and a bronze at the 2017 European U23 Championships, both held in Bydgoszcz, Poland.

Career
She became Norwegian champion in 2015, 2016 and 2017, representing Laksevåg TIL.

Her personal best in the event is 71.43 metres set in Tempe in 2019. This is the current national record.

She hails from Bergen with a Norwegian mother and Chilean father. Her sister Paula Nedberge Llano was a pole vaulter on national level, with bronze medals at the Norwegian championships in 2010, 2013, 2014 and 2015.

Achievements

References

External links
 

1997 births
Living people
Sportspeople from Bergen
Norwegian people of Chilean descent
Norwegian female hammer throwers
World Athletics Championships athletes for Norway
Norwegian expatriates in the United States
Georgia Bulldogs track and field athletes
Norwegian Athletics Championships winners